New Jersey Lady Stallions were a USL W-League club based in Wayne, New Jersey, associated with the former Men's USL team, the New Jersey Stallions. The team folded after the 2004 season.

Year-by-year

Honors
 USL W-League Northeast Division Champions 2003

Notable former players
  Yael Averbuch
  Sheree Gray
  Nikki Krzysik
  Christie Rampone
  Kelly Smith

References

Women's soccer clubs in New Jersey
Defunct USL W-League (1995–2015) teams
New Jersey Stallions
2004 disestablishments in New Jersey
2003 establishments in New Jersey
Association football clubs established in 2003
Association football clubs disestablished in 2004
Wayne, New Jersey